Carnival is the 11th album by Canadian jazz trumpeter Maynard Ferguson on Columbia Records. This is yet another attempt to replicate the success of Conquistador. Another big theme song ("Battlestar Galactica"), a couple of originals, a blast from the past ("Stella by Starlight"), and a cover of "Birdland", which was well received.

Background and production 
In preparing for this album, Maynard proved once again just how keenly aware he was of what was going on in the world of music ("Fantasy" and "Baker Street" had become hits mere months before entering the studio, and "Birdland" was still growing in popularity after its debut the year before), but he was having trouble converting these sensibilities into chart success. Having taken over the reins as producer, he hedged his bets by including a couple of songs from his past, re-recording the Slide Hampton arrangement of "Stella by Starlight" (originally on his 1959 release "A Message from Birdland", which featured Joe Zawinul in one of his earliest US appearances), and a new arrangement of "Over the Rainbow" (the original was recorded for the 1956 release "Dimensions", after recording it as part of Charlie Barnet's band years before).

Critical reception 
AllMusic's Scott Yanow wrote "Maynard Ferguson's version of "Birdland" from this LP was a bit of a hit and he fares fairly well on "Stella by Starlight" and "Over the Rainbow," but overall this typically commercial Columbia album is of lesser interest."

Reissues 
In 2003, Carnival was reissued by Wounded Bird Records.

Track listing 
 Maynard Ferguson: Trumpet solos on all tracks except "Baker Street" (Flugelhorn)

Personnel

The MF Band 

 Maynard Ferguson: MF Holton Trumpets, Firebird, Superbone, Flugelhorn
 Eric Traub: Tenor & Soprano Saxophone
 Mike Migliore: Alto & Soprano Saxophone, Flute
 Bob Militello: Baritone Saxophone, Flute, Alto flute, Piccolo
 Nick Lane: Trombone
 Phil Gray: Trombone
 Stan Mark: Trumpet, Flugelhorn
 Joe "Loon" Mosello: Trumpet, Flugelhorn, Piccolo trumpet, Percussion
 Dennis Noday: Trumpet, Flugelhorn
 Dan Welty: Trumpet, Flugelhorn
 Ron Tooley: Trumpet, Flugelhorn
 Biff Hannon: Fender Rhodes Electric Piano, Polymoog, Micromoog & Minimoog Synthesizers
 Gordon Johnson: Electric & Acoustic Bass, Flute
 John Qdini: Acoustic & Electric guitar
 Bob Economou: Drums
 Peter Erskine: Drums
 Gordon, Peter, Biff, John, Kim, Tony, Joe & Nick: Handclaps

Additional musicians 

 Ralph MacDonald: Percussion
 Rubens Bassini: Percussion
 String Concertmasters: Aaron Rosan, Paul Winter

Vocals 

 Maretha Stewart
 Hilda Harris
 Barbara Massey
 Yolanda McCullough
 Vivian Cherry

Production 

 Produced by Maynard Ferguson
 Associate Producer: Dr. George Butler
 Engineered by Mike Delugg at Mediasound, New York City
 Engineered by Stan Tonkel at CBS 30th Street Studio, NYC ("Stella by Starlight")
 Mastered by Bob Ludwig at Masterdisk Studios, NYC
 Cover Illustration: Milton Glaser
 Design: Paula Scher

Management 

 Personal Management: Kim Ferguson
 Business Management: Ames & Associates
 Representation: The Willard Alexander Agency
 Public Relations: Peter Levinson Communications
 Musical Coordinator: Gene Bianco

References

External links 
 

1978 albums
Columbia Records albums
Maynard Ferguson albums